Columbus is a town in and the county seat of Stillwater County, Montana, United States. The population was 1,857 at the 2020 census.

History
The community originated as a stagecoach station on the Yellowstone River.

The original name was Sheep Dip, then changed to Stillwater, but because of a Stillwater, Minnesota on the Northern Pacific Railroad, the mail presented a problem. The name was ultimately changed to Columbus, Montana in 1893.

Geography and climate
Columbus is located at  (45.64, -109.25).

Columbus is located between the Yellowstone River, the old Yellowstone Trail, Highway 10, and now Interstate 90.

According to the Köppen Climate Classification system, Columbus has a warm-summer humid continental climate, abbreviated "Dfb" on climate maps.

Demographics

2010 census
As of the census of 2010, there were 1,893 people, 767 households, and 517 families residing in the town. The racial makeup of the town was 96.5% White, 0.1% African American, 0.6% Native American, 0.4% Asian, 0.4% from other races, and 2.1% from two or more races. Hispanic or Latino of any race were 2.7% of the population.

There were 767 households, of which 33.9% had children under the age of 18 living with them, 55.9% were married couples living together, 9.0% had a female householder with no husband present, 2.5% had a male householder with no wife present, and 32.6% were non-families. 28.3% of all households were made up of individuals, and 13.8% had someone living alone who was 65 years of age or older. The average household size was 2.41 and the average family size was 2.97.

The median age in the town was 40.4 years. 26% of residents were under the age of 18; 6.1% were between the ages of 18 and 24; 23.8% were from 25 to 44; 27.4% were from 45 to 64; and 16.7% were 65 years of age or older. The gender makeup of the town was 48.5% male and 51.5% female.

2000 census
As of the census of 2000, there were 1,748 people, 709 households, and 455 families residing in the town. The population density was 1,449.6 people per square mile (557.8/km2). There were 762 housing units at an average density of 631.9 per square mile (243.1/km2). The racial makeup of the town was 96.62% White, 0.23% African American, 1.26% Native American, 0.11% Asian, 0.11% from other races, and 1.66% from two or more races. Hispanic or Latino of any race were 1.60% of the population.

There were 709 households, out of which 33.3% had children under the age of 18 living with them, 54.0% were married couples living together, 7.1% had a female householder with no husband present, and 35.7% were non-families. 31.0% of all households were made up of individuals, and 12.6% had someone living alone who was 65 years of age or older. The average household size was 2.37 and the average family size was 2.98.

In the town, the population was spread out, with 26.7% under the age of 18, 5.9% from 18 to 24, 28.2% from 25 to 44, 22.5% from 45 to 64, and 16.6% who were 65 years of age or older. The median age was 38 years. For every 100 females there were 97.3 males. For every 100 females age 18 and over, there were 91.5 males.

The median income for a household in the town was $33,750, and the median income for a family was $46,103. Males had a median income of $37,750 versus $20,417 for females. The per capita income for the town was $17,689. About 9.8% of families and 13.6% of the population were below the poverty line, including 15.6% of those under age 18 and 15.7% of those age 65 or over.

Infrastructure
Woltermann Memorial Airport is a public use airport located southeast of town. 

The 100 kW solar array at the Stillwater Smelter was the first “behind-the-meter” industrial scale solar installation project in Montana.

Education
Columbus Public Schools educates students from kindergarten through 12th grade. Columbus High School's team name is the Cougars.

Stillwater County Library is a public library which serves the area.

Notable people

 Annie Duke, professional poker player, lived here with her husband.
 Dwan Edwards, professional football player, attended high school here.
 William Thomas Hamilton, known as Wildcat Bill, a 19th-century frontiersman, scout, trapper, trader and author.
 Jack Vaughn, Assistant Secretary of State, Ambassador to Panama and Colombia, and Director of the Peace Corps from 1966 to 1969, was born in Columbus.

References

External links
 City of Columbus
  Columbus demographic profile

Towns in Stillwater County, Montana
County seats in Montana